Theology and Science is the journal of the Center for Theology and the Natural Sciences. It has a stated dedication to peer-reviewed articles on religion and science. The co-editors are Ted Peters and Robert John Russell. It is published by Routledge. The first volume was published in 2003.

Abstracting and indexing
The journal is indexed and abstracted in the following bibliographic databases:

References

External links
Main Website
U.K. Publisher Website

Graduate Theological Union
Routledge academic journals
Religious studies journals